Belinda Allison is an Australian mountain bike orienteer. She won a silver medal in the middle distance at the 2004 World MTB Orienteering Championships, shared with Laure Coupat, and placed sixth in the long distance.

References

Australian orienteers
Female orienteers
Australian female cyclists
Mountain bike orienteers
Living people
Place of birth missing (living people)
Year of birth missing (living people)
21st-century Australian women